Simeon Chatzis (born 30 March 1957) is a retired Greek football defender.

References

1957 births
Living people
Greek footballers
Apollon Smyrnis F.C. players
AEK Athens F.C. players
Association football defenders